This is a listing of the horses that finished in either first, second, or third place and the number of starters in the Gulfstream Park Turf Handicap, an American Grade 1 race for horses four years old and older at 1-1/8 miles on the turf held at Gulfstream Park in
Hallandale Beach, Florida.  (List 1986–present)

** Take the points won the 2010 Gulfstream Park Turf Handicap but was disqualified and placed fifth.

References

 Gulfstream Park Breeders' Cup Turf Stakes at Thoroughbred Times
 Gulfstream Park Breeders' Cup Turf Stakes at Pedigree Query

Gulfstream Park